Choristis discotypa is a species of moth of the Tortricoidea superfamily. It is found in Australia, where it has been recorded from Queensland.

The wingspan is about 12 mm. The forewings are whitish-grey, the costa tinged with reddish-brown and with reddish-brown markings, which are edged with ochreous-whitish. The hindwings are grey.

References

Tortricoidea
Moths of Australia
Moths described in 1916